Ville-Marie—Le Sud-Ouest—Île-des-Sœurs is a federal electoral district in Quebec, Canada, that has been represented in the House of Commons of Canada since 2015. It encompasses a portion of Quebec formerly included in the electoral districts of Jeanne-Le Ber, Westmount—Ville-Marie, Laurier—Sainte-Marie and Outremont.

Ville-Marie—Le Sud-Ouest—Île-des-Sœurs was created by the 2012 federal electoral boundaries redistribution and was legally defined in the 2013 representation order. It came into effect upon the call of the 42nd Canadian federal election, which took place 19 October 2015.

The riding was originally intended to be named Ville-Marie.

Geography
The riding included the western part of Ville-Marie (downtown), the neighbourhoods of Saint-Henri, Little Burgundy, Griffintown and Pointe-Saint-Charles in the Le Sud-Ouest borough. As well as Nuns' Island  in the borough of Verdun.

Demographics
According to the Canada 2016 Census
 Languages (2016 mother tongue) : 43.4% French, 21.1% English, 6.2% Arabic, 5.2% Mandarin, 4.3% Spanish, 2.8% Farsi, 1.6% Russian, 1.5% Bengali, 1.1% Cantonese, 0.9% Italian, 0.8% Portuguese, 0.8% Korean, 0.7% Romanian, 0.6% Vietnamese, 0.5% German, 0.5% Polish, 0.4% Urdu, 0.4% Hindi, 0.4% Turkish, 0.4% Greek, 0.3% Tamil, 0.3% Panjabi, 0.3% Hungarian, 0.3% Bulgarian, 0.3% Japanese, 0.3% Armenian

Members of Parliament

This riding has elected the following Members of Parliament:

Election results

References

Federal electoral districts of Montreal
2013 establishments in Quebec
Ville-Marie, Montreal
Le Sud-Ouest
Verdun, Quebec